Kowalowce  is a village in the administrative district of Gmina Zabłudów, within Białystok County, Podlaskie Voivodeship, in north-eastern Poland.

References

Kowalowce
Grodno Governorate
Białystok Voivodeship (1919–1939)